The 2014 Baltic Chain Tour was the fourth modern edition of the Baltic Chain Tour road cycling race. It was held over a period of five days between 20 and 24 August 2014. The race was a part of the 2014 UCI Europe Tour with a race classification of 2.2.

Teams
A total of 20 teams raced in the 2014 Baltic Chain Tour: 12 UCI Continental teams, 5 national teams and 3 amateur tams.

Belarus (national team)

EC St Etienne-Loire
Estonia (national team)
Experiment 23
Team Frøy–Bianchi
Germany (national team)

Lithuania (national team)

Russia (national team)
SJK Viiking

Top Team Cycling

Route

Stages

Stage 1
20 August 2014 — Vilnius (Lithuania) to Panevėžys (Lithuania),

Stage 2
21 August 2014 — Riga (Latvia) to Sigulda (Latvia),

Stage 3
22 August 2014 — Valmiera (Latvia) to Pärnu (Estonia),

Stage 4
23 August 2014 — Pärnu (Estonia) to Viljandi (Estonia),

Stage 5
24 August 2014 — Viljandi (Estonia) to Tallinn (Estonia),

Classification leadership table

References

External links

Baltic Chain Tour
Baltic Chain Tour
Baltic Chain Tour
Baltic Chain Tour
Baltic Chain Tour